Interstate 90 (I-90) is an east–west transcontinental freeway and the longest Interstate Highway in the United States at . It begins in Seattle, Washington, and travels through the Pacific Northwest, Mountain West, Great Plains, Midwest, and the Northeast, ending in Boston, Massachusetts. The highway serves 13 states and has 16 auxiliary routes, primarily in major cities such as Chicago, Cleveland, Buffalo, and Rochester.

I-90 begins at Washington State Route 519 in Seattle and crosses the Cascade Range in Washington and the Rocky Mountains in Montana. It then traverses the northern Great Plains and travels southeast through Wisconsin and the Chicago area by following the southern shore of Lake Michigan. The freeway continues across Indiana and follows the shore of Lake Erie through Ohio and Pennsylvania to Buffalo. I-90 travels across New York by roughly following the historic Erie Canal and traverses Massachusetts, reaching its eastern terminus at Massachusetts Route 1A near Logan International Airport in Boston.

The freeway was established by the Federal-Aid Highway Act of 1956, replacing a series of existing U.S. highways that had been preceded by local roads and auto trails established in the early 20th century. I-90 was numbered in 1957, reflecting its status as the northernmost transcontinental route of the system, and construction was underway on several sections with funding from the Federal-Aid Highway Act.

The route also incorporates several toll roads that predate the Interstate Highway System, including the Jane Addams Memorial Tollway, Indiana Toll Road, Ohio Turnpike, New York State Thruway, and the Massachusetts Turnpike. These toll roads opened in the 1950s and were followed by toll-free sections in Pennsylvania and Wisconsin that were finished in the 1960s. The Midwestern sections of I-90 were fully completed in 1978, and the majority of the route between Seattle and South Dakota opened by 1987. The final section, near the western terminus in Seattle, opened in September 1993; an eastern extension in Boston was completed in 2003 as part of the Big Dig project.

Route description

|-
|
|
|-
|
|
|-
|
|
|-
|
|
|-
|
|
|-
|
|
|-
|
|
|-
|
|
|-
|
|
|-
|
|
|-
|
|
|-
|
|
|-
|
|
|-
|Total
|
|}

The transcontinental freeway passes through 13 states in the Pacific Northwest, Mountain West, Great Plains, Midwest, and the Northeast regions of the United States. The toll road sections comprise 25 percent of the freeway's total length.

According to 2011 data from the Federal Highway Administration, the busiest section of I-90 is in the Chicago area, where a daily average of 306,574 vehicles use the freeway. The lowest daily traffic counts on I-90 were recorded in Wyoming, where an average of 9,820 vehicles used rural sections of the freeway.

Washington

The western terminus of I-90 is at an intersection with Washington State Route 519 and 4th Avenue South in the SoDo neighborhood of Seattle. The junction is south of Downtown Seattle, adjacent to the Port of Seattle and two major sports stadiums, Lumen Field and T-Mobile Park. The freeway travels east through an interchange with I-5 and around Beacon Hill before it enters the Mount Baker Ridge Tunnel alongside the future 2 Line of the Link light rail system, set to open in 2023. I-90 emerges from the tunnel on a pair of floating bridges, among the longest of their kind: the eastbound-only Lacey V. Murrow Memorial Bridge and the Homer M. Hadley Memorial Bridge, which carries westbound traffic and the future light rail line.

The floating bridges cross Lake Washington to Mercer Island, where I-90 travels through a series of tunnels under  of parkland, including Aubrey Davis Park. The freeway continues from the island and enters Bellevue, the largest city of the Eastside region, and intersects I-405 near Factoria. I-90 then travels along Lake Sammamish and through Issaquah as it leaves the Seattle metropolitan area and ascends into the Cascade Range on the Mountains to Sound Greenway, a designated National Heritage Area and National Scenic Byway. The freeway crosses Snoqualmie Pass, elevation , at the crest of the mountain range near a ski resort.

From Snoqualmie Pass, I-90 follows the Yakima River into the Kittitas Valley and intersects I-82 in Ellensburg after a brief concurrency with U.S. Route 97 (US 97). The highway crosses the Columbia River on the Vantage Bridge and turns northeast to climb the cliffs of the Columbia Plateau near George. After traveling east across Moses Lake and the surrounding agricultural region, I-90 begins a long concurrency with US 395 at Ritzville as the highways turn northeast towards Spokane. I-90/US 395 is joined by US 2 through western Spokane, where it intersects US 195. The freeway crosses downtown Spokane on an elevated viaduct and splits from US 2 and US 395 to continue east across Spokane Valley towards the Idaho state line.

Idaho

I-90 traverses the Idaho Panhandle region at the north end of the state, where it connects Coeur d'Alene to communities in the Silver Valley. From the Washington state line, the freeway follows the Spokane River through Post Falls and Huetter to the city of Coeur d'Alene, where it intersects US 95, the state's main north–south highway. I-90 then turns southeast to bypass Coeur d'Alene and travel along a series of ridges that face Lake Coeur d'Alene, crossing an arm of the lake on the Veterans Memorial Centennial Bridge.

The freeway continues east across Fourth of July Summit and descends into the Silver Valley, where it follows the Coeur d'Alene River through several small towns along the historic Mullan Road. I-90 serves the cities of Kellogg and Wallace before it ascends into the Bitterroot Range and crosses Lookout Pass, which also marks the Montana state line.

Montana

Montana has the longest section of I-90, at almost , despite the highway only serving a portion of the state's east–west width. It descends from Lookout Pass along the St. Regis and Clark Fork rivers between the foothills of the Bitteroot Range and Coeur d'Alene Mountains. The freeway travels east through the Alberton Gorge and crosses the Clark Fork River several times before it reaches the head of the Missoula Valley. After a short concurrency with US 93, I-90 runs along the north side of Missoula and joins US 12 to continue southeast along the foothills of the Garnet Range and Sapphire Mountains.

After it splits from US 12 in Garrison, the freeway turns south to traverse the Deer Lodge Valley. The freeway travels east across the Jefferson Valley and passes the headwaters of the Missouri River near Three Forks. It then enters the Gallatin Valley.

I-90 travels around Bozeman, where it is joined by US 191, and crosses Bozeman Pass between the Bridger and Gallatin mountains. At the east end of the mountains, the freeway begins to follow the Yellowstone River and is briefly concurrent with US 89, which serves Yellowstone National Park, and splits from US 191 at Big Timber. I-90 continues along the Yellowstone River through Billings, overlapping with US 87 and US 212, until it reaches Lockwood, the western terminus of I-94. The freeways split and I-90 continues east across the Bighorn Basin before it turns south near Hardin to follow the Little Bighorn River into the Crow Indian Reservation. The highway passes the site of the Battle of the Little Bighorn near Crow Agency and continues south along the river and the Wolf Mountains into Wyoming.

From 1995 to 1999, there was no numbered daytime speed limit on rural highways in Montana, including I-90. The speed limit was simply defined as "reasonable and proper" as determined on a case-by-case basis by the Montana Highway Patrol until the Montana Supreme Court ruled it was unconstitutional.

Wyoming

I-90 serves a portion of northeastern Wyoming that is primarily rural. The freeway, briefly concurrent to US 14, travels southeast along a series of creeks to Sheridan in the northeastern foothills of the Bighorn Mountains. I-90 and US 87 split in Sheridan and travel parallel to each other to Fort Phil Kearny, where they rejoin and continue south past Lake Desmet to Buffalo. The highways split again near Buffalo at a junction with I-25, which overlaps with US 87 to Casper.

From Buffalo, the highway turns east to cross the Powder River Basin, a region with several large coal mines. I-90 then reaches Gillette, where it begins a concurrency with US 14 and US 16 to a three-way split in Moorcroft. The freeway continues into the Bear Lodge Mountains (part of the Black Hills) and is rejoined in Sundance by US 14, which looped north to serve the Devils Tower. I-90/US 14 then continues northeast to Beulah, where it enters South Dakota.

South Dakota

I-90/US 14 enters South Dakota near Spearfish and travels east through prairie land, where it is briefly concurrent with US 85. Beyond Sturgis, the freeway turns south and follows the edge of the Black Hills to Rapid City, the gateway to Mount Rushmore. It then skirts the northern edge of Rapid City, which is served by spur route I-190, and passes Ellsworth Air Force Base while it continues east across the plains. I-90 splits from US 14 near Wall, home to the Wall Drug roadside attraction and located northeast of Badlands National Park.

The freeway travels southeast into the Buffalo Gap National Grassland and also passes a pair of decommissioned missile silos that form the Minuteman Missile National Historic Site. I-90 continues east along the top of a plateau that faces the White River and passes near Kadoka and Murdo. US 83 briefly joins the highway from Murdo to Vivian, where it splits off to serve the state capital of Pierre. It then crosses the Missouri River on the Lewis and Clark Memorial Bridge near Chamberlain and passes a rest area which overlooks the river and includes the  Dignity statue. From Chamberlain, I-90 continues east across the plains and past several small towns near the city of Mitchell. It then reaches the Sioux Falls area, where it bypasses the city to the north and intersects I-29 and I-229. I-90 leaves Sioux Falls and crosses into Minnesota near Brandon.

Minnesota

I-90 crosses the southern portion of Minnesota and carries unsigned Legislative Route 391 across the state. From the South Dakota border near Beaver Creek to Albert Lea, the freeway travels east across farmland and towns in the plains and rolling hills of the Buffalo Ridge. It also intersects several north–south highways, including US 75 in Luverne, US 59 in Worthington, US 71 in Jackson, and US 169 in Blue Earth. I-90 travels around the northern outskirts of Albert Lea and intersects I-35 northeast of the city. It then reaches Austin and a brief concurrency with US 218.

From Austin, the freeway turns northeast to head towards Rochester, which it bypasses to the south and intersects US 63 and US 52. I-90 continues east into the hilly Driftless Area and descends from the bluffs that overlook Lake Onalaska on the Mississippi River. It turns southeast at Dakota and is joined by US 14 until the highways split near La Crescent. I-90 turns east before it reaches La Crescent, where it crosses the Mississippi River on the Dresbach Bridge into Wisconsin.

Wisconsin

I-90 enters Wisconsin near La Crosse and bisects French Island before it reaches Onalaska. This section is briefly concurrent to US 53 between La Crosse and Onalaska. The freeway travels east, generally along the La Crosse River, through several towns and Fort McCoy before it reaches a junction with I-94 in Tomah. The two Interstates join at Tomah and travel southeast along the edge of the hills of the Western Upland, following the Lemonweir and Wisconsin rivers. It passes Wisconsin Dells, situated on the gorge of the same name and home to several water parks and theme parks.

The freeway travels east from Wisconsin Dells to the Portage area, where I-39 begins its concurrency with I-90/I-94. The highway then crosses the Wisconsin River and travels south towards Madison, where it forms an eastern bypass of the city. East of Madison, I-94 separates from I-39/I-90, which continues southeast through Edgerton and Janesville. The highway turns south and enter Beloit, where it intersects I-43 and crosses into Illinois.

Illinois

I-90 uses several sections of the Illinois Tollway system as it traverses the northeastern corner of the state, primarily in the Chicago metropolitan area. It enters the state from Beloit, Wisconsin, and remains concurrent to I-39 and US 51 on the Jane Addams Memorial Tollway through the eastern outskirts of Rockford, where the highways split off. I-90 continues on the tollway as it follows US 20 southeast through Belvidere and Elgin in the Fox Valley.

The tollway cuts through the northwestern suburbs of Chicago, where it intersects I-290 in Schaumburg and passes the north side of O'Hare International Airport. On the east side of the airport in Rosemont, I-90 intersects I-294 and I-190, the latter of which serves the airport's passenger terminals and marks the end of the tollway. The freeway, now named the Kennedy Expressway, travels through northwestern Chicago, where the Blue Line of the "L" rapid transit system runs in the median and serves several stops. I-90 turns southeast and is rejoined by I-94 in Irving Park, where it gains a set of reversible express lanes that travel for  toward the Near West Side.

The Kennedy Expressway travels south through the Near West Side, opposite the Chicago River from the Chicago Loop (the city's central business district), and intersects I-290 again at the Jane Byrne Interchange. The freeway continues onto the Dan Ryan Expressway and crosses the Chicago River near Chinatown and an interchange with I-55. The Dan Ryan is the widest section of I-90, at 12 through lanes, and is split between local and express lanes. I-90/I-94 is joined by the "L" Red Line in the median of the expressway through the city's South Side, where it passes Guaranteed Rate Field, the Illinois Institute of Technology campus, and Washington Park. I-90 splits from the Dan Ryan Expressway in Englewood and turns southeast onto the tolled Chicago Skyway. The tolled Skyway travels towards the Indiana state line, which the freeway crosses near the Calumet River in the East Side.

Indiana

The entirety of I-90 within Indiana is concurrent with the Indiana Toll Road, which crosses the state's northern fringe and is mostly shared with I-80. From the Illinois state line, the tollway travels south through Hammond and turns east to follow the Grand Calumet River through northern Gary, where it intersects US 41 and US 12. I-90 then crosses I-65 in eastern Gary and I-94 in Lake Station, where it begins a concurrency with I-80.

I-94 travels northeast near the Lake Michigan shoreline from Lake Station to Michigan City, while the Indiana Toll Road (I-80/I-90) follows it to the south. The tollway then moves closer to the Michigan–Indiana state line and turns east, passing through the northern outskirts of South Bend and Elkhart. In South Bend, it intersects US 31 and passes near the University of Notre Dame. I-80/I-90 travels parallel to the state line until it reaches an interchange with I-69 near Fremont, where it turns southeast. The tollway then turns east and crosses the Ohio state line near Angola.

Ohio

At the state line near Montpelier, I-80/I-90 transitions from the Indiana Toll Road to the Ohio Turnpike, which crosses northern Ohio. The highway continues east around several rural towns as it approaches the Toledo area. The turnpike crosses under I-475 in Maumee without an interchange; access to I-475 is instead provided through a nearby junction with US 20. I-80/I-90 then continues southeast across the Maumee River to Rossford on the southern outskirts of Toledo, where it intersects I-75.

The turnpike travels southeast through a rural area near the southwest shore of Lake Erie, where it passes the cities of Fremont and Sandusky. Near Norwalk, the highway turns northeast to follow State Route 2 (SR 2) and heads to Elyria, where I-90 splits from I-80 (which remains on the turnpike). The freeway then merges with SR 2 and continues northeast through the lakeshore suburbs west of Cleveland, including Rocky River and Lakewood. I-90 and SR 2 separate after crossing the Rocky River and travel parallel to each other as they enter Cleveland. I-90 continues through the southwestern residential neighborhoods of Cleveland and reaches a junction with I-71 and I-490 in Tremont, where it turns north.

From Tremont, I-90 turns north onto the Innerbelt Freeway and crosses the Cuyahoga River into Downtown Cleveland on the George V. Voinovich Bridges. The Innerbelt skirts the south side of Downtown Cleveland, where it intersects I-77 near Progressive Field and turns north to bisect the Goodrich–Kirtland Park neighborhood. Near Cleveland Burke Lakefront Airport, the freeway makes a sharp, 90-degree turn (nicknamed "Dead Man's Curve" for its frequent crashes) and rejoins SR 2 on the Cleveland Memorial Shoreway until they split again in Euclid. I-90 briefly turns southeast but resumes its northeastern route after a junction with I-271 in Willoughby Hills. The freeway travels parallel to the Lake Erie shoreline through farmland and exurban towns and crosses into Pennsylvania near Conneaut.

Pennsylvania

Within Pennsylvania, I-90 is non-tolled and generally travels northeast around several communities on the Lake Erie shoreline and remains entirely in Erie County. It enters the state in Springfield Township and passes through rural areas along the lake shore, parallel to US 20 and the Lake Road. The freeway then travels through the southern outskirts of Erie, where it intersects I-79 and US 19. I-90 returns to the rural areas of northeastern Erie County and intersects I-86 before it reaches the New York state line near the borough of North East. At , the Pennsylvania section is I-90's shortest within a single state.

New York

I-90 enters New York in Chautauqua County and runs concurrently with the mainline of the tolled New York State Thruway. It travels northeast along the Lake Erie shoreline between Lake Road to the north and US 20 to the south through Dunkirk and Fredonia. The highways enter the Buffalo area, where the toll road runs north–south through Cheektowaga and forms an eastern bypass, using auxiliary routes I-190 and I-290 to serve the city. At a junction with I-290 near Buffalo Niagara International Airport, I-90 turns east to follow the historic Water Level Route of the New York Central Railroad, itself parallel to the 19th-century Erie Canal.

The Thruway passes south of Rochester, which it serves via a loop on I-490 and the direct north–south spur I-390. I-90 travels through the Finger Lakes region and moves closer to the Erie Canal as it approaches the Syracuse area. It travels through the city's northern outskirts, where it intersects I-690, I-81, and I-481 from west to east. It then continues to Utica, where the Thruway runs along the north side of the Mohawk River (part of the Erie Canal). The section through Utica, connected to the city's downtown via I-790, was built between the lines of SR 49, which does not merge with the Thruway.

I-90 then closely follows the Mohawk River southeast through several towns and villages between the foothills of the Catskill and Adirondack mountains. The Thruway then reaches Schenectady, which it bypasses to the southwest and intersects I-88 and I-890, the latter of which serves the city's downtown. The highway continues southeast into Albany to a junction with I-87, where I-90 splits from the Thruway, which turns south to serve New York City. I-90 travels east as a toll-free freeway through the northern neighborhoods of Albany and intersects I-787 before it crosses the Hudson River into Rensselaer. The freeway travels south around Rensselaer and rejoins the Thruway via the Berkshire Connector, which continues east into the Taconic Mountains towards the Massachusetts state line.

The mileposts and sequential exit numbers on the New York State Thruway mainline originate from New York City, increasing northward on I-87 and westward on I-90; as a result, the mileposts and exit numbers on I-90 through most of New York run backwards compared to federal preference for mile-based numbers increasing from west to east. The Berkshire Connector uses west-to-east mileposts and exit numbers with a "B" prefix; the toll-free section of I-90 through Albany and Rensselaer uses conventional west-to-east mileposts and exit numbers despite being geographically north–south. I-90 is currently the only Interstate that has a complete set of nine spur routes within one state, all numbers being used. In addition, I-990, a short spur route near Buffalo that is not directly connected to I-90, is the highest number given to an Interstate.

Massachusetts

I-90 in Massachusetts is concurrent with the entirety of the Massachusetts Turnpike (also known as "the Pike" or "MassPike"). The turnpike begins at the New York state line in West Stockbridge and travels southeast through the Berkshires to the Pioneer Valley. The highway travels through the northern suburbs of Springfield, where it intersects I-91 and crosses the Connecticut River into Chicopee. I-90 then crosses over I-391 without an interchange and serves as the northern terminus of I-291 on the eastern outskirts of the city. The turnpike continues east through the hills of Central Massachusetts and serves as the eastern terminus of I-84 in the town of Sturbridge.

From Sturbridge, the turnpike travels northeast towards Worcester and passes through the city's southern outskirts. It serves as the respective northern and western terminus of I-395 and I-290 in Auburn, located southwest of Worcester, and continues to an interchange with I-495 near Westborough at the edge of Greater Boston. I-90 travels through the western suburbs of Boston and travels through Framingham before it intersects I-95/Route 128, the main beltway around Boston, on the border of Weston and Newton. The turnpike continues along the Charles River into Boston, where it descends into a tunnel that passes Boston University, Fenway Park, and under the Prudential Tower complex in the Back Bay neighborhood.

I-90 intersects I-93 on the south side of Downtown Boston and travels under the Fort Point Channel to serve the Seaport District. The turnpike then enters the Ted Williams Tunnel, which travels northeast under Boston Harbor to the passenger terminals at Logan International Airport. After it passes the northwest side of the airport, I-90 terminates at an interchange with Route 1A in East Boston.

History

Predecessors and establishment

An east–west controlled access highway to serve the Northern United States was proposed in the early 20th century in several federal government documents, including reports from the Bureau of Public Roads in the 1930s and 1940s. The Interstate Highway System was created by the Federal-Aid Highway Act of 1956, which was approved by the U.S. Congress and signed into law on June 26, 1956. I-90 was assigned to the northernmost transcontinental route in the system by the American Association of State Highway Officials in 1957.

The freeway would travel along existing parts of the United States Numbered Highway System, which was established at the suggestion of the federal government in 1926 to replace the named auto trails. Among these auto trails, which were generally designated by private motorist organizations, were the transcontinental Yellowstone Trail and National Parks Highway, created in the 1910s along the future route of I-90 between Seattle and Boston. The national numbered highways along the corridor included US 10 from Seattle to Billings, Montana; US 87 from Billings to Buffalo, Wyoming; US 16 from Buffalo to Portage, Wisconsin; US 51 from Portage to Rockford, Illinois and US 20 from Rockford to Boston.

Tollways and urban construction

Major portions of I-90 in the Midwest and Northeastern states used existing toll roads built by state governments in the 1950s and 1960s. The Northwest Tollway, Chicago Skyway, Indiana Toll Road, Ohio Turnpike, New York State Thruway, and Massachusetts Turnpike all predate I-90 and were incorporated into the route. This also meant that portions of the route did not adhere to Interstate Highway standards, but they were either deemed adequate or rebuilt to conform by the 1980s. The Pennsylvania section was planned in the early 1950s as the "Erie Extension" of the Pennsylvania Turnpike, but was instead completed as a toll-free road in October 1960 with federal funds. The completion of the section also allowed for full use of the New York State Thruway, which had been finished three years earlier but ended abruptly at the state line.

I-90 would use several expressways and tollways in the Chicago area, the earliest of which was the Tri-State Expressway (now the Kingery Expressway), completed in 1950 and extended into Indiana the following year. It was followed by the Congress Expressway in the western suburbs, first opened in 1955, and the Northwest Tollway in 1958. The last section to be completed in Illinois was the toll-free Dan Ryan Expressway, which opened on December 15, 1962, and was described as the "world's widest freeway" at the time. In 1965, the designation for I-90 was switched with I-94 south of Chicago, which moved it to the tolled Chicago Skyway (completed in 1958); the change was requested by the Illinois and Indiana state governments to avoid confusion and provide a continuous toll connection to the Indiana Toll Road, which had been fully opened in 1956. I-90 was moved onto the Kennedy Expressway in 1977 and its western route was replaced with I-290 from Schaumburg to the Circle Interchange in Chicago.

The other tolled sections of I-90 were completed in the 1950s by their respective state governments. The  Ohio Turnpike opened to traffic on October 1, 1955, three years after construction began. The first segment of the New York Thruway opened in June 1954 and was followed by extensions to Buffalo and the Albany area by the end of the year. It was extended to the Pennsylvania state line in 1957 and to the Massachusetts Turnpike via the Berkshire Connector in 1959.

Non-tolled construction

The freeway also incorporated other non-tolled expressway bypasses planned by state governments in the early 1950s and modified to meet Interstate standards. A bypass of Spokane Valley, Washington, opened in November 1956 as the first section in Washington and was extended into neighboring Spokane two years later. Wisconsin opened their first section in November 1959, connecting the terminus of the Illinois Tollway with Janesville, and extended the freeway through the Madison area to Wisconsin Dells in 1962. The Cleveland Innerbelt opened in stages from 1959 to 1962 and was originally planned to connect with the Parma Freeway, which would have carried I-90 around the northwest side of Downtown Cleveland. It was later cancelled in the 1960s amid public opposition. The first Minnesota section, built to bypass Austin, began construction in 1957 and opened in 1961.

Wisconsin was among the first states to complete its rural Interstate system and opened its final section of I-90, from La Crosse to Tomah, in November 1969. The section around Albany, New York, built as a toll-free alternative to the New York Thruway, was completed in 1976 with a connection to the Berkshire Connector, which had been originally intended to carry the I-90 designation across the Hudson River. South Dakota completed its final section in November 1976, which created an unbroken stretch of four-lane highway from the Wyoming state line to Boston but some intersections remained. The Minnesota segment of I-90 was declared complete in September 1978 with a dedication at Blue Earth, where a golden line was painted to emulate the golden spike of the first transcontinental railroad. Two months later, Ohio finished its last section west of Cleveland.

The western states were the last to complete their segments of I-90. Wyoming opened its final section, from the Montana state line to Sheridan, in July 1985 and dedicated it three months later following the completion of Montana's cross-border section. The last two-lane section in Montana, near Springdale, was upgraded to four lanes in May 1987. One of the last rural sections of I-90 to be built was through Wallace, Idaho, which placed its downtown on the National Register of Historic Places in 1976 to prevent its demolition for the freeway. The  elevated freeway bypassed Wallace to the north and cost $42 million (equivalent to $ million in  dollars) to construct. It opened on September 12, 1991, and the city ceremonially retired the last stoplight on I-90. The Idaho section was declared fully complete in July 1992 after the Veterans Memorial Centennial Bridge opened near Coeur d'Alene.

Completion and later projects

Washington was the last state to complete its section of I-90, primarily due to disputes and litigation over the Seattle–Bellevue section. The Snoqualmie Pass section was completed in 1981 with a viaduct for westbound traffic that stands  over Denny Creek. The viaduct replaced an earlier plan for a ground-level freeway at the behest of environmentalists; the Mountains to Sound Greenway was established in 1990 along the corridor between Seattle and Thorp to preserve wilderness and recreational areas and was designated as a National Scenic Byway in 1998, a first for an Interstate Highway. The extension into Seattle was completed in stages between 1989 and 1993 and cost $1.56 billion (equivalent to $ in  dollars) to construct. The project involved construction of a new floating bridge, expansion of the Mount Baker Ridge Tunnel, addition of lids with parks, and extensive mitigation for environmental and social impacts. The project was originally planned to be completed in 1992, but was delayed a year due to the sinking of the original floating bridge during renovations in November 1990; the bridge was rebuilt and opened for eastbound traffic on September 12, 1993.

Extensions at both termini of I-90 were completed in the early 2000s as part of separate projects. The west end at Washington State Route 519 in Seattle was rebuilt as a series of ramps near Safeco Field (now T-Mobile Park) to replace an existing intersection. A component of the Big Dig megaproject in Boston that extended I-90 east by  under Fort Point Channel and Boston Harbor to Logan International Airport opened on January 18, 2003, at a cost of $6.5 billion (equivalent to $ in  dollars). The Fort Point Channel tunnel later closed in July 2006 due to a ceiling panel collapse that killed one person. It reopened in January 2007 after repairs and retrofit work.

Other sections of I-90 have been rebuilt or replaced to accommodate modern needs and meet updated safety standards. The  Dan Ryan Expressway in Chicago was reconstructed over a two-year period from 2006 to 2007 at a cost of $975 million (equivalent to $ in  dollars), adding auxiliary lanes and improved bridges. The section carried over 300,000 daily vehicles prior to the project. Cleveland's Innerbelt Bridge, which carried I-90 over the Cuyahoga River, was replaced with the George V. Voinovich Bridges, which opened in November 2013 for westbound traffic and September 2016 for eastbound traffic. The old bridge was imploded with explosives on July 12, 2014, and dismantled by the end of the year. The states of Minnesota and Wisconsin replaced the Dresbach Bridge over the Mississippi River in 2016; the project was spearheaded by Minnesota following the I-35W Mississippi River bridge collapse in 2007.

Names and designations

I-90 carries several commemorative names designated by state governments, some of which are shared between multiple states. Washington and Minnesota designated their sections as the "American Veterans Memorial Highway". In the states of Idaho, Montana, and South Dakota, I-90 is part of the Purple Heart Trail, which honors Purple Heart recipients. In Wisconsin, I-90 and I-94 were designated as the Wisconsin Veterans Memorial Highway in 1987. From Lorain, Ohio, through Pennsylvania and New York, I-90 is officially designated as the "AMVETS Memorial Highway".

Major intersections
Washington
  in downtown Seattle
  in downtown Seattle
  in Bellevue near Seattle
  in Ellensburg
  in Ritzville; joined for  until Spokane
  in Spokane; joined for 
Idaho
  in Coeur d'Alene
Montana
  near Missoula; joined for 
  in Missoula; joined for  until Garrison
  in Butte; joined for 
  in Bozeman; joined for  until Big Timber
  in Livingston; joined for 
  in Laurel; joined for  until Crow Agency
  in Billings; joined for  until Sheridan, Wyoming
  near Billings
Wyoming
  in Ranchester; joined for  until Sheridan
  near Buffalo; joined for 
  in Buffalo
  in Gillette; joined for  until Moorcroft
  in Sundance; joined for  until Wall, South Dakota
South Dakota
  in Spearfish; joined for 
  in Rapid City
  in Murdo; joined for  until Vivian
  in Presho
  near Plankinton
  in Sioux Falls
  in Sioux Falls
Minnesota
  in Luverne
  in Worthington
  in Jackson
  in Blue Earth
  in Albert Lea
  in Austin; joined for 
  in Stewartville
  in Rochester
  in Dakota; joined for  until La Crescent
Wisconsin
  in La Crosse; joined for  until Onalaska
  in Tomah, Lyndon, and Delton
  in Tomah; joined for  until Madison
  in Portage; joined for  until Cherry Valley, Illinois
  in Burke
  in Madison
  in Madison
  in Christiana; joined for  until Albion
  in Beloit
Illinois
  in South Beloit; joined for  until Rockford
  in Hampshire
  in Schaumburg
  in Rosemont near Chicago
  to O'Hare International Airport near Chicago
  in Chicago; joined for 
  in downtown Chicago
  in downtown Chicago
  near Chicago
Indiana
  in Hammond
  in Gary
  in Gary
  in Lake Station
  in Lake Station; joined for  until Elyria, Ohio
  in New Durham Township
  in South Bend
  in York Township
  in Fremont
Ohio
  in Maumee
  in Rossford near Toledo
  in Lake Township
  near Milan
  in Cleveland
  in Cleveland
  in Cleveland
  in downtown Cleveland
  in downtown Cleveland
  in downtown Cleveland
  in downtown Cleveland
  in Euclid
  in Willoughby Hills near Cleveland
Pennsylvania
  in Springfield Township
  near Erie
  near Erie
  near Erie
  near North East
New York
  in Hanover
  in West Seneca
  in Buffalo
  in Williamsville near Buffalo
  near Bergen
  near Rochester
  near Victor
  near Syracuse
  in Syracuse
  near Syracuse
  in Utica
  near Schenectady
  in Rotterdam
  near Schenectady
  in Albany
  in downtown Albany
  in downtown Albany
  in East Greenbush
  in Schodack
Massachusetts
  in Lee
  in Westfield
  in West Springfield
  in Chicopee near Springfield
  in Sturbridge
  in Auburn
  in Millbury
  in Hopkinton
  in Weston
  in Boston
 /Logan International Airport in Boston

Auxiliary routes
Source: FHWA

 Rapid City, South Dakota: I-190
 Chicago, Illinois: I-190 and I-290
 Cleveland, Ohio: I-490
 Buffalo, New York: I-190, I-290, I-990 (not directly connected)
 Rochester, New York: I-390, I-490, I-590 (not directly connected)
 Syracuse, New York: I-690
 Utica, New York: I-790
 Schenectady, New York: I-890
 Worcester, Massachusetts: I-290, I-190 (not directly connected)

I-90 in New York is the only Interstate Highway to have a complete set of auxiliary routes, all nine possible three-digit route numbers, within a single state. Seven of the thirteen states that the highway passes through do not have auxiliary routes of I-90.

See also
 Business routes of Interstate 90

References

External links

 
 I-90 at Interstate-Guide.com

 
90
90